Garreta is a genus of dung beetles (subfamily Scarabaeinae) in the scarab beetle family (Scarabaeidae). There are more than 20 described species; most are African and some are from Asia. They are generally found in fairly moist habitats (forest, moist savanna and upland grassland).

All species are ball-rolling dung beetles.

Species
 Garreta australugens Davis & Deschodt, 2018
 Garreta azureus (Fabricius, 1801)
 Garreta basilewskyi (Balthasar, 1964)
 Garreta bechynei Pokorny & Zidek, 2018
 Garreta caffer (Fahraeus, 1857)
 Garreta crenulatus (Kolbe, 1895)
 Garreta dejeani (Castelnau, 1840)
 Garreta diffinis (Waterhouse, 1890)
 Garreta fastiditus (Harold, 1867)
 Garreta gilleti (Garreta, 1914)
 Garreta laetus (Hope, 1842)
 Garreta lugens (Fairmaire, 1891)
 Garreta malleolus (Kolbe, 1895)
 Garreta matabelensis (Janssens, 1938)
 Garreta mombelgi (Boucomont, 1929)
 Garreta morosus (Fairmaire, 1886)
 Garreta mundus (Wiedemann, 1819)
 Garreta namalugens Davis & Deschodt, 2018
 Garreta nitens (Olivier, 1789)
 Garreta nyassicus (Kolbe, 1897)
 Garreta opacus (Redtenbacher, 1848)
 Garreta ruficornis (Motschulsky, 1854)
 Garreta rutilans (Castelnau, 1840)
 Garreta smaragdifer (Walker, 1858)
 Garreta sumptuosus (Castelnau, 1840)
 Garreta sylvestris Mittal, 2011
 Garreta unicolor (Fahraeus, 1857)
 Garreta wahlbergi (Fahraeus, 1857)

Gallery

References

Scarabaeinae